Drew Saunders may refer to:

Drew P. Saunders (born 1938), Democratic member of the North Carolina General Assembly
Drew Saunders (MP) (died 1579), Member of Parliament (MP) for Brackley

See also
Andrew Saunders (disambiguation)